Christopher or Chris Scott may refer to:

Sports
Chris Scott (Australian footballer) (born 1976), Australian rules footballer and coach
Chris Scott (cricketer, born 1964), English cricketer for Nottinghamshire and Durham
Chris Scott (cricketer, born 1959), English cricketer for Lancashire
Chris Scott (defensive end) (born 1961), American football defensive end
Chris Scott (English footballer) (born 1980), football player for Burnley and Leigh RMI
Chris Scott (offensive lineman) (born 1987), American football offensive tackle
Christopher Scott (cyclist) (born 1968), Australian Paralympian cyclist
Chris Scott (discus thrower) (born 1988), British discus thrower who competed at the 2010 Commonwealth Games
Christopher Scott (footballer, born 2002), German footballer

Others
Chris Scott (musician), British bass player for 1980s pop groups Talulah Gosh and Saturn 5
Chris Scott (writer) (born 1945), English-Canadian writer
Christopher C. Scott (1807–1859), Justice of the Arkansas Supreme Court
Christopher J. Scott, television, film and theater producer in New York City
Christopher Scott (painter), partner of Henry Geldzahler
Christopher Scott (scientist), British space physicist